The 2013 South American Artistic Gymnastics Championships were held in Santiago, Chile, December 2–8, 2013. This was the 12th edition of the South American Artistic Gymnastics Championships for senior gymnasts. The competition was initially scheduled for August, and was approved by the International Gymnastics Federation.

Participating nations

Medalists

Medal table

References

2013 in gymnastics
2013
International gymnastics competitions hosted by Chile
2013 in Chilean sport